The 1967 Brabantse Pijl was the seventh edition of the Brabantse Pijl cycle race and was held on 27 March 1967. The race started and finished in  Sint-Genesius-Rode. The race was won by Roger Rosiers.

General classification

References

1967
Brabantse Pijl